William Obront (27 March 1924 – 12 October 2017), better known as "Obie", was a Canadian-American gangster and the principal money launderer for the Cotroni family of Montreal, often described as being the "Canadian Meyer Lanksy".

Criminal career

Money launderer
One of three children of Rebecca and Jacob Obront, he was born in Montreal into a family of butchers of Russian-Jewish descent. Obront began working in his uncle's butcher shop in the Atwater Market as a teenager. In the late 1940s, he opened up the Hi-Ho Cafe and the Bal Tabarin nightclub, both of which were popular with the Montreal underworld. Regular visitors to Obront's businesses included the gangsters Vincenzo Cotroni and Nicola Di Iorio of Montreal, plus Salvatore Giglio of New York's Bonanno family. In 1950, he opened up the Beret Blue nightclub alongside the gangsters Peter Adamo and Frank D'Asti. His businesses were considered to be just fronts for money laundering for the Cotroni family. By the end of the 1950s, Obront was a millionaire, and on 12 October 1961, he founded Trans-World Investment Ltd, which engaged in both legal and illegal financial ventures. One of Obront's clients was Mitchell Bronfman of the famous Bronfman family. Mitchell was the nephew of the whiskey tycoon Samuel Bronfman, who was one of Canada's richest men.

Mitchell Bronfman had opened up the Execaire Aviation Limited airline, which operated unprofitably between 1962 and 1974. Despite being a Bronfman, he was unable to access the family fortune, which was held in trust, forcing him to turn to Obront to keep his airline flying. Between 1967 and 1974, Bronfman borrowed $1,417,250 from Obront. The association with Bronfman served to give Obront credibility on Saint Jacques Street (the financial district of Montreal).

The Munsinger affair
In 1966, Obront featured heavily in the Munsinger affair. The Munsinger Affair was a scandal occasioned by the discovery that Gerda Munsinger, a German woman who lived in Canada and who was accused of being a Soviet spy, had been the long-time mistress of the former associate defense minister Pierre Sévigny. Munsinger, a former prostitute in her native Germany, had worked as a waitress at the Chic 'n' Coop Restaurant in Montreal which was owned by Obront. Allegations were made that Obront was aware of Munsinger's relationship with Sévigny and had set up secret cameras in her bedroom to record Munsinger having sex with Sévigny while he was the associate defense minister for the purpose of blackmailing the government of John Diefenbaker. Munsinger, who returned to Germany by the time the scandal broke, was initially described as being dead. Robert Reguly, a reporter from The Toronto Star tracked her down to her apartment in Munich, and she stated in the ensuring interview that she had feared Obront, whom she described as being very close to a number of powerful gangsters in Montreal. A journalist, Max Plante, called Cotroni and Obront "The Untouchables" of the Montreal underworld who could never be prosecuted.

Tainted meat merchant
In 1967, four different companies controlled by Obront won the right to supply meat for concession stands at Expo 67. The Fleu de Ly Vending Machine Company, owned by Obront's nephew Joe Frankel, was one of the companies supplying the meat which in turn came from Obront-owned Obie's Meat Market, which purchased its meat in turn from Reggio Foods. The owner of Reggio Foods was Armand Courville of the Cotroni family. At the time, Claude Wagner, a politician with the Liberal party accused the Union Nationale government of Daniel Johnson Sr. of corruption, saying all four companies that won the contracts to supply food for the concession stands at Expo 67 were run by people from the Cotroni family.

In 1975, the Royal Commission known as La Commission d'Enuête sur le Crime Organisé (CECO) reported that 400,000 pounds of the meat supplied to Expo 67 was unfit for human consumption as Obront and his associates used meat intended as dog food instead in order to increase his profits. In 1973, the firm of Reggio Foods supplied the meat at the Quebec Summer Games at Rouyn-Noranda, which caused so many athletes to become seriously ill after eating the meat that the games had to be cancelled. The Quebec health authorities seized 20,000 pounds of meat from Reggio Foods, which turned out to be decaying horse meat with the labels saying it was unfit for human consumption having been ripped off. In 1975, Reggio Foods was shut down by the Quebec health authorities for its gross violations of the food safety laws, through Courville was not charged.

Stock market fraudster
Obront also engaged in stock market fraud, manipulating the prices of shares and engaging in insider trading. Obront ultimately faced 400 charges of financial misconduct for his "boiler room" stock market operations. As a non-Italian, Obront could never be a "made man", but he was known to be close to both Vincenzo Cotroni and Paolo Violi who used him very heavily to launder their money. In 1973, Obront took charge of the bookmaking in the Ottawa-Hull area on behalf of the Cotroni family. Obront's operations in the Ottawa area handed an average of about $50,000 bets per day, with 25% of the daily earnings going to Violi. Through his partner Harry Workman, Obront took control of a number of brokerage firms with good reputations, which he liked because it made it easier to him to swindle the investors. The people who invested their wealth in Obront-controlled brokerage firms almost always lost their money.

Through Obront was talented at making money, he was also by his own admission "a degenerate gambler" who had a compulsion to gamble, sometimes betting as much as $50,000 on a typical weekend. To assist with his money laundering, Obront incorporated numerous companies, many of which were just "dummy corporations" which existed only to create a confusing paper trail. Between 1950 and 1975, Obront was involved in 38 different companies as either an owner, director or shareholder. La Commission d'Enuête sur le Crime Organisé in its 1977 report Organized Crime and the World of Business stated:  "One of the characteristics common to all the companies incorporated in Quebec in which William Obront was known to have had interests, openly or through a front-man, is the fact that they almost never complied with the laws concerning the information required annually from companies in Quebec...People who hide behind many real or fictitious corporations are also trying to cover their tracks and mislead the police, the income tax authorities, and the public. Tycoons are very adept at using this technique. William Obront did not invent or create this method, but he made use of it on a grand scale for a long time". As the chief financial officer for the Cotroni family, Obront had to provide thousands of dollars in cash for various illegal transactions, often on a short notice as Violi would tell him to provide the money for any transaction that he was engaged in.

Conviction
From 1970 to 1975, Obront had at least nine bank accounts at four different banks. In 1974 and 1975, bank records showed that 46 people and 14 companies deposited amounts ranging from $2,500 to $1.7 million in Obront's bank accounts. Obront's financial records show that he made a profit of $18 million for the Cotroni family in 1974 and 1975 while Obront in filing his taxes claimed an annual income of only $38,000. In August 1974, Obront fled to Florida to avoid having to testify at La Commission d'Enuête sur le Crime Organisé. In Miami, Obront applied for U.S. citizenship. He ceded his Canadian citizenship in order to become an American national in November 1975.

In 1975, Obront was charged with tax evasion, with the government claiming that he had an undeclared income of $2,197,801 between 1965 and 1973. In May 1976, following an extradition request from Canada, Obront fled to Costa Rica, but was ordered to return to Canada. Under handcuffs from the detectives from the Royal Canadian Mounted Police, Obront was flown back to Canada. For refusing to testify at the commission, Obront served a year in prison. Obront was also convicted of defrauding investors in Obie's Meat Market of $51,991 and sentenced to four years in prison and fined $75,000 on 3 December 1976.

In 1978, the Commisso brothers sent the hitman Cecil Kirby to Montreal to kill Irving Kott, a stockbroker who worked for Cotroni and Obront. Kirby was told that Cotroni had received a contract to kill Kott from one of his business partners who in turn had passed on the contract to the Commisso brothers, but he believed that Kott had cheated Cotroni who did not want to admit to being fooled. In 1979, Obront was convicted of tax evasion and sentenced to 20 months in prison plus ordered to pay $683,3046 in back taxes. As he was no longer a Canadian citizen, he was expelled to the U.S. after serving his sentence.

Obront was convicted of immigration violations in Miami on 2 December 1980, causing U.S. authorities to seek his deportation. On 21 July 1983, he was arrested in Florida together with Nick Cotroni, the son of Vic Cotroni, on charges of smuggling the Quaalude drug from Quebec into Florida, making an annual profit of about $50 million U.S. dollars. Obront was convicted in an American court of twelve drug-related charges on 7 June 1984. He was sentenced to serve a 20-year prison term and ordered to pay $50,000 in restitution. Incarcerated at USP Lewisburg in Pennsylvania, Obront had his U.S. citizenship revoked by American authorities. His subsequent appeals to the Federal Court to have his Canadian citizenship reinstated were unsuccessful. Obront was released from prison in March 2002.

Death
Obront died at a retirement home in Miami on 12 October 2017, at the age of 93.

Books

References

1924 births
2017 deaths
20th-century Canadian Jews
21st-century Canadian Jews
20th-century Canadian criminals
Canadian male criminals
Canadian gangsters
Canadian drug traffickers
Money launderers
Canadian fraudsters
Criminals from Montreal
Canadian people convicted of tax crimes
Canadian people convicted of drug offences
Canadian prisoners and detainees
Prisoners and detainees of Canada
Canadian people imprisoned abroad
Prisoners and detainees of the United States
People extradited from Costa Rica
People extradited to Canada
Canadian expatriates in Costa Rica
Canadian expatriates in the United States
Cotroni crime family
Organized crime in Montreal
Canadian people of Russian-Jewish descent
Canadian butchers
Naturalized citizens of the United States